Eslamabad (also Romanized as Eslāmābād) is a village in Gazin Rural District, Raghiveh District, Haftgel County, Khuzestan Province, Iran. At the 2006 census, its population was 94, in 16 families.

References 

Populated places in Haftkel County